Trelassick is a hamlet northwest of Ladock, Cornwall, England, United Kingdom.

References

Hamlets in Cornwall